This is an incomplete list of Statutory Instruments of the United Kingdom in 1954. This listing is the complete, 30 items, "Partial Dataset" as listed on www.legislation.gov.uk (as at March 2014).

Statutory Instruments
The Import of Goods (Control) Order 1954 SI 1954/23
The Railway Clearing House Scheme Order 1954 SI 1954/39
The Double Taxation Relief (Taxes on Income) (Greece) Order 1954 SI 1954/142
The Coal Industry (Superannuation Scheme) (Winding Up, No. 6) Regulations 1954 SI 1954/155
The Foreign Compensation (Hungary) (Registration) Order 1954 SI 1954/219
The Foreign Compensation (Roumania) (Registration) Order 1954 SI 1954/221
The Civil Defence (Transport) Regulations 1954 SI 1954/274
The Removal of Bodies Regulations 1954 SI 1954/448
The Import of Goods (Control) (Amendment) Order, 1954 SI 1954/627
The Visiting Forces Act, 1952 (Commencement) Order, 1954 SI 1954/ 633
The Visiting Forces (Designation) Order 1954 SI 1954/ 634
The Visiting Forces Act (Application to Colonies) Order 1954 SI 1954/ 636
The Visiting Forces (Designation) (Colonies) Order 1954 SI 1954/ 637
The Atomic Energy Authority (Appointed Day) Order, 1954 SI 1954/ 832
The British Transport Commission (Male Wages Grades Pensions) Regulations 1954 SI 1954/ 898
The Non-Indigenous Rabbits (Prohibition of Importation and Keeping) Order 1954 SI 1954/ 927
The Motor Vehicles (Variation of Speed Limit) (Amendment) Regulations, 1954 SI 1954/ 943
The Visiting Forces (Designation) (Colonies) (Amendment) Order 1954 SI 1954/1041
The Local Government Superannuation (Benefits) Regulations, 1954 SI 1954/1048
The Agriculture (Miscellaneous Provisions) Act, 1954, (Commencement) Order, 1954 SI 1954/1137
The Superannuation (Local Government Staffs) (National Service) (Amendment) Rules 1954 SI 1954/1228
The Local Government Superannuation (England and Scotland) (Amendment) Regulations 1954 SI 1954/1250
The Landlord and Tenant (Determination of Rateable Value Procedure) Rules 1954 SI 1954/1255
The Justices of the Peace Act, 1949 (Compensation) Regulations 1954 SI 1954/1262
The Foreign Compensation (Hungary) (Registration) (Amendment) Order 1954 SI 1954/1371
The Duty-Free Supplies for the Royal Navy Regulations 1954 SI 1954/1406
The British Transport Commission (Amendment of Pension Schemes) Regulations 1954 SI 1954/1428
The Savings Bank Annuities (Tables) Order 1954 SI 1954/1578
British Transport Commission (Organisation) Scheme Order 1954 (1)  SI 1954/1579
The Public Service Vehicles and Trolley Vehicles (Carrying Capacity) Regulations 1954 SI 1954/1612

Unreferenced Listings
The following 8 items were previously listed on this article, however are unreferenced on the authorities site, included here for a "no loss" approach.
Purchase Tax (No. 1) Order, 1954 SI 1954/1
Purchase Tax (No. 2) Order, 1954 SI 1954/2
Purchase Tax (No. 3) Order, 1954 SI 1954/3
National Insurance (Industrial Injuries) (Prescribed Diseases) Amendment Regulations, 1954 SI 1954/5
Coal Industry Nationalisation (Interim Income) (Rates of Interest) Order, 1954 SI 1954/10
Pedestrian Crossing Regulations 1954 SI 1954/370
Horses (Landing from Northern Ireland and the Republic of Ireland) Order 1954 SI 1954/698
Rotherham (Repeal of Local Enactments) Order 1954 SI 1954/1450

See also
 List of Statutory Instruments of the United Kingdom

References

External links
Legislation.gov.uk delivered by the UK National Archive
UK SI's on legislation.gov.uk
UK Draft SI's on legislation.gov.uk

Lists of Statutory Instruments of the United Kingdom
Statutory Instruments